The Automobile Information Disclosure Act of 1958, 15 U.S.C. §§ 1231–1233, was passed in June 1958 by Congress and took effect in January 1959. It was sponsored by Oklahoma Senator Almer Stillwell "Mike" Monroney, after whom the resulting "Monroney sticker" was named.

The law has been amended and now requires that all new automobiles carry a sticker on a window containing important information about the vehicle, including:

The manufacturer's suggested retail price (MSRP)
Engine and transmission specifications
Standard equipment and warranty details
Optional equipment and pricing
City and highway fuel economy ratings, as determined by the Environmental Protection Agency

External links
Consumers Union

1958 in American law
United States federal transportation legislation